Bell Farm may refer to:

in Canada
Bell Farm (Indian Head, Saskatchewan), an endangered Canadian Heritage site

in the United States
Bell Farmhouse, Newark, Delaware
Bell Ranch, New Mexico
Bryan-Bell Farm, Pollocksville, North Carolina, listed on the NRHP in North Carolina
Hiram Bell Farmstead, Columbiana, Ohio
John Bell Farm, West Whiteland, Pennsylvania
Marcus Sears Bell Farm, New Richmond, Wisconsin